Macrocybe pachymeres is a species of mushroom that is native to Sri Lanka and India.

References

Tricholomataceae
Fungi of India
Taxa named by Miles Joseph Berkeley
Taxa named by Christopher Edmund Broome